This is the discography of German techno band Scooter. Founded in December 1993 in Hamburg, Scooter is known for being one of the most successful German bands as well as for having sold over 30 million records worldwide. Since 1993, the trio has released 20 studio albums, five compilation albums, five live albums and 73 singles, as well as six video albums and 74 music videos. Scooter, who have gathered 80 gold and platinum awards throughout the years, are composed of H.P. Baxxter, Marc Blou and Jay Frog.

Albums

Studio albums

Compilation albums

Live albums

Video albums

Video albums that come with a specific edition(s) of a studio album

Singles

The First Chapter

The Second Chapter

The Third Chapter

The Fourth Chapter

The Fifth Chapter

The Sixth Chapter

The Seventh Chapter

Other appearances

Remixes

Charity projects

Singles

Music videos

Tribute projects

Albums

Singles

Music videos

Notes

References
General
 

Specific

External links
 Official website
 Scooter at AllMusic
 
 

Electronic music discographies
Discographies of German artists
Pop music group discographies